Gustafi are a Croatian folk rock band formed in Vodnjan, a small town in Istria, in 1980. The band was founded by Edi Maružin, Vlado Maružin, Čedomir Mošnja, Igor Arih and Livio Morosin and was originally called Gustaph y njegovi dobri duhovi. They released their first album titled V in 1985.

The band is known for their eclectic style which combines Istrian folk music and rock, along with blues and Tex-Mex influences. They are considered one of the most prominent examples of the so-called ča-val (Cha Wave), a type of pop rock music accompanied with lyrics sung in the chakavian dialect spoken in Istria, which became popular in the mid-1990s in Croatia (other notable performers of ča-val are Alen Vitasović and Šajeta).

Discography
 V (1985)
 Tutofato (1994)
 Zarad tebe (1995)
 Sentimiento muto (1997)
 Vraćamo se odmah (1999)
 Na minimumu (2002)
 Gust of (2004)
 Tampon, vol. 1 (2005)
 F.F. (2006)
 Chupacabra (2009)
 Kanibalkanska (2012)
 Maneštra (2015)

External links
Unofficial website 
Gustafi at the Menart Records official website 

Croatian musical groups
Croatian rock music groups
Musical groups established in 1980